Ideoroncidae is a family of pseudoscorpions belonging to the order Pseudoscorpiones. Members of the family are known from Asia, Africa, western North America and South America.

Genera:
 Afroroncus Mahnert, 1981
 Albiorix Chamberlin, 1930
 Botswanoncus Harvey & Du Preez, 2014
 Dhanus Chamberlin, 1930
 Ideoroncus Balzan, 1887
 Mahnertius Harvey & Muchmore, 2013
 Muchmoreus Harvey, 2013
 Nannoroncus Beier, 1955
 Negroroncus Beier, 1931
 Pseudalbiorix Harvey, Barba, Muchmore & Pérez, 2007
 Shravana Chamberlin, 1930
 Sironcus Harvey, 2016
 Typhloroncus Muchmore, 1979
 Xorilbia Harvey & Mahnert, 2006

A fossil genus, Proalbiorix is known from the Cenomanian aged Burmese amber of Myanmar, which has close affinities with African and New World rather than Asian genera.

References

Pseudoscorpions
Arachnid families